The Trouble with the Truth is the eighth studio album by American country music artist Patty Loveless, released on January 23, 1996. It peaked at number 10 on the Billboard Top Country albums charts, and number 86 on the Pop charts. It was certified Platinum for shipments of over 1,000,000 copies in the U.S. The singles "Lonely Too Long" and "You Can Feel Bad" both made number 1 on the Hot Country Songs charts; "She Drew a Broken Heart" hit number 4. "A Thousand Times a Day" and the title track both made Top 20 hitting number 13 and 15 respectively.

"Tear-Stained Letter" is a cover of a song which was originally recorded by British singer Richard Thompson, and again in 1988 by country singer Jo-El Sonnier, whose version was a Top 10 country hit. Additionally, "A Thousand Times a Day" was previously cut by George Jones on his 1993 album High-Tech Redneck.

Critical reception

The album received a mostly-favorable review in Billboard which said that Loveless "manages to sound simultaneously contemporary and traditional", but criticized the cover of "Tear-Stained Letter" for not fitting thematically with the rest of the songs.

Track listing

Personnel
As listed in liner notes.

 Tom Britt – electric guitar
 Kathy Burdick – background vocals
 John Catchings - cello
 Jerry Douglas – Dobro, lap steel guitar (4)
 Dan Dugmore – pedal steel guitar (6), lap steel guitar (8)
 Stuart Duncan – fiddle, mandolin
 Paul Franklin – pedal steel guitar (except 6)
 Steve Gibson – acoustic guitar, electric guitar
 Vince Gill – background vocals
 Emory Gordy Jr. – bass guitar, string arrangements (10)
 Tim Hensley – background vocals
 John Hobbs – keyboards
 Amy Hughes - engineer
 Craig Krampf – drums (6, 8)
 Mike Lawler – keyboards
 Butch Lee – Hammond B–3 organ
 Patty Loveless – lead vocals
 Donna McElroy – background vocals
 Liana Manis – background vocals
 Russ Martin - engineer
 Brent Mason – electric guitar
 Nashville String Machine – string section
 Carmella Ramsey – background vocals
 Mike Rojas – keyboards
 Jim Rushing – bass vocals
 Dawn Sears – background vocals
 Harry Stinson – background vocals
 Biff Watson – acoustic guitar, electric guitar
 Jeff White – background vocals
 Lonnie Wilson – drums (except 6, 8)
 Curtis Young – background vocals
Technical
Caroline Greyshock - photography

Chart performance

References

1996 albums
Patty Loveless albums
Albums produced by Emory Gordy Jr.
Epic Records albums